Emil John (Jan) Konopinski (December 25, 1911 in Michigan City, Indiana – May 26, 1990 in Bloomington, Indiana) was an American nuclear scientist of Polish descent. His parents were Joseph and Sophia.

He was, with George Uhlenbeck as thesis advisor, a 1934 Ph.D graduate of the University of Michigan, and later a professor of physics at Indiana University. His doctoral students include Eugene Greuling. During WW II Konopinski collaborated with Enrico Fermi on the first nuclear reactor at the University of Chicago. He also joined the Manhattan Project to develop the first nuclear weapon (atomic bomb).

He, together with C. Marvin and Edward Teller, showed that a thermonuclear explosion would not ignite the atmosphere and thereby destroy the earth.

An Atomic Energy Commission consultant from 1946 to 1968, he wrote a book entitled The Theory of Beta Radioactivity.

References

External links

Emil J. Konopinski, UHA: Indiana University – Award Honoree

American nuclear physicists
20th-century American physicists
Experimental physicists
Theoretical physicists
1911 births
1990 deaths
Manhattan Project people
Indiana University faculty
University of Michigan alumni
American people of Polish descent
People from Michigan City, Indiana
Fellows of the American Physical Society